Claudio Baglioni  (born 16 May 1951) is an Italian pop singer-songwriter and musician. His career has been going on for over 50 years. Some songs from the 70s are part of Italian culture as Questo piccolo grande amore proclaimed Italian song of the century in 1985. In the 80s he released the two best-selling albums ever in Italy Strada facendo and La vita è adesso. And in the 90s he embraced World Music with the discs of the time trilogy, which began with Oltre (1990), continued with the incredible success of Io sono qui (1995) and ended with Viaggiatore sulla coda del tempo (1999). In 2006 he composed the anthem of the 2006 Winter Olympics.

Biography
Around 1968 he composed the Annabel Lee musical suite, based on a poem by Edgar Allan Poe. In 1969, he released his first single and recorded the single Signora Lia; a comic song that tells of a lady's marital infidelity, over time the song will become a cult of Italian pop music despite its poor initial success. He collaborated with Italian singer Mia Martini for her debut album.

Success came only in 1972, with the album Questo piccolo grande amore; the homonymous song in 1985 will be awarded as the Italian song of the century. In 1974, he recorded the album E tu ... with Vangelis. In 1975, it comes out Sabato pomeriggio; a concept album about waiting, based on Giacomo Leopardi's poems. In 1977, the album Solo; the first in which he makes lyrics, music and production on his own. In 1978, comes the incredible success with the album E tu come stai?.

In 1981, he produced the hugely successful album Strada facendo. The following year the Alé-Oó tour starts, the first tour of an Italian singer in the big stadiums. The name of the tour in fact takes its cue from a typical chorus of football matches. In June of the same year (1982) Claudio at the age of 31 becomes a father and in one day writes the worldwide hit song Avrai dedicated to his son.

In 1985, comes the incredible success of the album La vita è adesso, the best-selling album of all time in Italy, immediately after the release of the album begins the 1985 tour that totaled over 1.5 million spectators with the final concert in Rome which was the first concert in the history of Italian music to be broadcast live on TV, the overwhelming success of the album kicks off another big tour the following year; Assolo a sensational tour consisting of over 30 concerts in the great stadiums of Italy where Claudio Baglioni performs completely alone, without a band, with the help of classical and electric guitar, pianola, piano, synthesizer and MIDI, a technology never tested at the time.

The live album Assolo is based on the concert at the stadium in the city of Milan to which almost 100,000 people will flock, the triple album was a commercial success in Europe. The success of Claudio in this decade is so high that around the end of 1985 the first collection for the European market of the singer-songwriter was released, entitled Claudio Baglioni, containing the best ten songs of the singer-songwriter of the 80s.

In 1988, he participated in a concert of the Human Right Now! tour with Peter Gabriel, Sting and Bruce Springsteen.

In 1990, after 3 years of work he released the double album Oltre, an ambitious project with 20 songs that embrace World Music and the participation of great international artists; the album will radically change the Italian music industry. The concert of 1991 will be decreed by Billboard magazine as the best concert of the year in the world, thanks to the stage that is located in the center of the stadium with the public surrounding it in the round. In the same year the European version of the record Oltre is marketed.

In 1995, the album Io sono qui was released, which marks Claudio's return to the scene, the disc deals with the theme of comedy, everyday life is in fact a bit of a comedy for everyone where everyone wears a mask without knowing if he is an actor or a spectator of life.

And in 1999, the album Viaggiatore sulla coda del tempo, with the imminent arrival of the new millennium, tackles the theme of modern technologies and at the same time tells of the journey of a traveler towards this unknown future. Baglioni will subsequently declare that the three albums make up a trilogy of time where each represents the past, present and future respectively.

On 6 June 1998, he had his last concert of the millennium at the Olympic stadium in Rome, the concert totaled over 100,000 spectators thanks to the stage in the center and the spectators who filled the stadium, still this record remains undefeated by any event, both musical and sporty.

In the 2000s, he released the album Sono io, In 2010, he did a series of concerts around the world. In 2013 he released the album Con voi and in 2020, the album In questa storia, che è la mia.
In 2019, to celebrate 50 years of career, he realizes an incredible concert at the Verona Arena which for the first time is open to the public in its entirety. With the stage in the center and the spectators filling the entire arena in the round.

In the summer of 2022 the incredible last tour Dodici note begins, where in the first stages he performs in the theaters of Italy with only the piano and then between June and July filling the great outdoor arenas of Verona, Rome and Siracusa for the closing ending with the band.

Discography

Live albums

Compilations

European albums
1985 - Claudio Baglioni
1991 - Oltre

Dvds
1991 - Oltre una bellissima notte 
1996 - Baglioni nel Rosso 
2000 - Acustico Tour 
2003 - Tutto in un abbraccio Tour 
2010 - World Tour 
2019 - Al centro - Arena di Verona

Tour

1977 - Claudio Baglioni on tour
1982 - Alé Oó
1985 - Tour 1985
1986 - Assolo 
1991 - Oltre una bellissima notte (only one concert)
1992 - Assieme
1995 - Tour Giallo 
1996 - Tour Rosso
1998 - Da me a te
1999 - Tour Blu 
2000 - Acustico 
2003 - Tutto in un abbraccio 
2007 - Tutti qui 
2010 - World Tour
2013 - Con voi tour
2019 - Al centro

Awards
1974 - Festivalbar, best song of the year
1982 - TV Sorrisi e Canzoni, first Italian artist to fill stadiums and spectator records
1985 - Sanremo Music Festival 1985, the Italian Song of the Century Award
1987 - TV Sorrisi e Canzoni, representative of Italian music
1991 - Billboard, best concert of the year in the world
1998 - TV Sorrisi e Canzoni, record spectators in a single concert
2001 - Internet Winner, increased number of contacts to its website in the last year
2003 - Lunezia Award, musical and literary value
2008 - Man of Peace
2019 - TV Sorrisi e Canzoni, record spectators tour

References

External links

Claudio Baglioni official fan club in Spain – Spanish
Claudio Baglioni official international fanclub – English (Actually offline; shows a warning in German language)
The Anthem of the Olympic Winter Games From Torino 2006's official website.

1951 births
Singers from Rome
People of Umbrian descent
Italian pop singers
Living people
Italian male conductors (music)
Italian male singers
Italian singer-songwriters
Italian composers
Italian male composers
21st-century Italian conductors (music)
21st-century Italian male musicians